The Remix Album is the second and final album by rap/reggae duo, Prince Ital Joe and Marky Mark.  The album was released in 1995 for Ultraphonic Records and was a remix album featuring remixes from the duo's previous album, Life in the Streets, as well as a Marky Mark solo track, "No Mercy".  This would mark the second and final album by Prince Ital Joe and the fourth album by Marky Mark.

Track listing
"United" (Damage Control Mix)- 6:18 
"Rastaman Vibration" (La Bouche Mix)- 5:54 
"Happy People" (Bass Bumpers Remix)- 5:45 
"Babylon" (Fun Factory Remix)- 5:18 
"Life in the Streets" (G-String Mix)- 4:13 
"Babylon" (Loop! Remix)- 6:34 
"United" (The World's Address Mix)- 6:45 
"Happy People" (Damage Control Remix)- 5:55 
"Rastaman Vibration" (House Groove Mix)- 6:00 
"Life in the Streets" (Abbey Road Mix)- 8:38 
"No Mercy"- 5:00

References

Prince Ital Joe albums
Mark Wahlberg albums
1995 remix albums